Psilocybe weraroa (formerly Weraroa novae-zelandiae) is a secotioid fungus in the family Hymenogastraceae. It is endemic to New Zealand. This species is closely related to Psilocybe cyanescens and is in the Cyanescens phylogenetic clade. As a bluing member of the genus Psilocybe it contains the psychoactive compounds psilocin and psilocybin.

Taxonomy and naming 
The species was first described in the literature in 1924 by the New Zealand-based mycologist Gordon Heriot Cunningham, under the name Secotium novae-zelandiae. Rolf Singer transferred it to Weraroa in 1958. Phylogenetic analysis by Moncalvo (2002) and Bridge et al. (2008) has demonstrated the close relationship between Weraroa novae-zelandiae and the hallucinogenic blue-staining group of Psilocybe, particularly Psilocybe subaeruginosa. Phylogenetic analysis published by Borovička and colleagues (2011) showed this species is very close to Psilocybe cyanescens. Given this and the apparently distant relation with other species of Weraroa  Borovička et al. (2011) suggested renaming the species Psilocybe weraroa.

Etomology 
The specific epithet weraroa is taken from the former generic name, which refers to the type locality. The binomial Psilocybe novae-zelandiae could not be used, as it had already been used in 1978 by Gastón Guzmán and Egon Horak for another Psilocybe species (now Deconica novae-zelandiae).

Description

 Cap: (1)3–5 cm tall, 1.5– 3 cm wide, irregularly roundish to ovate, elliptical or even depressed-globose, margin folded, light brown when young becoming pale blue-grey, often showing blue or blue-green stains with age, at first finely fibrillose becoming smooth, glabrous, slightly viscid, bruising blue when injured, slowly. Drying dingy brown. Gleba: Chocolate or sepia-brown, sparse, chambered, contorted gill-like structures. Stipe: Up to 40 mm tall, 6 mm thick, equal, cartilaginous, whitish to blue-grey, yellowish-brown at the base, hollow, bruising blue when injured.

Spores: 11–15(17) x 5–8 µm in size, smooth, sepia-coloured, elliptic-ovate or elliptical in shape, rounded at one end with a thin epispore.

Spore colour purple-brown; Odor and taste farinaceous.

Habitat and distribution
Solitary to crowded on decaying wood buried in forest leaf litter, often on the rotting branches of Melicytus ramiflorus. It has also been found fruiting on rotted cabbage trees and associated with decaying tree-fern fronds, native to the forests of New Zealand.

Fairly abundant in the early winter and spring months in lowland mixed rainforest near Wellington and Auckland. The mushroom can be difficult to see, often buried under leaves or eaten by slugs, and it is sometimes hard to find mature specimens that are not partially eaten. The species is endemic to New Zealand.

Similar species 
[[File:Clavogaster virescens.jpg|alt=Clavogaster virescens|left|thumb|Clavogaster virescens, a close lookalike often mistaken for P. weraroa by foragers.]]Clavogaster virescens'' is similar in appearance and habitat, but the gleba form a reddish brown chambered mass enclosed inside a sack-like structure within the perideum. The stem is stout, smooth and slightly slippery rather than fibrous, off-white to yellow, enlarged at the top where it often smoothly transitions into the pouch, and tapering towards a yellower base. The fungus does not have a bluing reaction; it is naturally blue to greenish blue, and has no psychoactive properties.

References

External links
 
 “Hey Man, Do they grow any Weraroa around here?” by Peter Werner
 Landcare Research NZFUNGI database
 Mycotopia

Entheogens
Psychoactive fungi
weraroa
Psychedelic tryptamine carriers
Fungi described in 1924
Fungi of New Zealand
Secotioid fungi